As part of the local elections in Wales on 4 May 2017, the 54 seats of Bridgend County Borough Council were up for election. Labour lost 13 seats, losing control of the council, while remaining the largest party.

Election Result

|}

Ward Results

Aberkenfig

Bettws

Blackmill

Blaengarw

Brackla

Bryncethin

Bryncoch

Bryntirion, Laleston and Merthyr Mawr

Caerau

Cefn Cribwr

Cefn Glas

Coity

Cornelly

Coychurch Lower

Felindre

Hendre

Litchard

Llangeinor

Llangewydd and Brynhyfryd

Llangynwyd

Maesteg East

Maesteg West

Morfa

Nant-y-moel

Newcastle

Newton

Nottage

Ogmore Vale

Oldcastle

Pen-y-fai

Pendre

Penprysg

Pontycymmer

Porthcawl East Central

Porthcawl West Central

Pyle

Rest Bay

Sarn

Ynysawdre

References

Bridgend
2017